This article contains information about the literary events and publications of 1680.

Events
February – Thomas Otway's blank verse tragedy The Orphan, or The Unhappy Marriage is premiered in London. 
The spring/summer production of Nathaniel Lee's Theodosius at Dorset Garden features Henry Purcell's earliest theatre music.
August 8 – The Comédie-Française is founded by decree of King Louis XIV of France to merge the two Parisian acting troupes of the time, those of the Guénégaud Theatre and the Hôtel de Bourgogne.
unknown dates
The poem-book Leabhar Cloinne Aodha Buidhe is transcribed by Ruairí Ó hUiginn of Sligo at the command of Cormac Ó Neill.
Innerpeffray Library, the oldest known (and surviving) public (lending) library in Scotland, is established.

New books

Prose
John Bunyan – The Life and Death of Mr. Badman
Gilbert Burnet – Some Passages of the Life and Death of...John Earl of Rochester
Sor Juana Inéz de la Cruz – Neptuno alegórico
Pedro Cubero – Peregrinación del mundo
Pu Songling – Strange Stories from a Chinese Studio (in manuscript only)
Sir Robert Filmer – Patriarcha published (written 1642)

Drama
 Aphra Behn –  The Revenge
Pedro Calderón de la Barca – Hado y Divisa de Leonido y Marfisa
John Crowne – The Misery of Civil War, adapted from Shakespeare's Henry VI, Part 2 and Part 3
Bernard le Bovier de Fontenelle – Aspar
Nathaniel Lee 
 Lucius Junius Brutus
 The Princess of Cleve
  Theodosius
 Lewis Maidwell – The Loving Enemies
Thomas Otway
The History and Fall of Caius Marius
The Orphan
The Soldier's Fortune
Jacques Pradon – Statira
Elkanah Settle 
 Fatal Love
 The Female Prelate
Nahum Tate – The Loyal General
 William Whitaker – The Conspiracy

Births
January 23 – Joseph Ames, English author (died 1759)
September 22 – Barthold Heinrich Brockes, German poet (died 1747)
Unknown dates
Nicola Coleti, Italian historian and priest (died 1765)
Elizabeth Germain, English philanthropist and correspondent (died 1769)
Probable year of birth
Ephraim Chambers, English encyclopedist (died 1740)
Cathal Buí Mac Giolla Ghunna, Irish poet in Gaelic (died 1756)
Nezim Frakulla, Albanian poet (died 1760)

Deaths
January 20 – Ann, Lady Fanshawe, English memoirist (born 1625)
March 14 – René Le Bossu, French critic (born 1631)
March 17 – François de La Rochefoucauld, French dramatist and writer of maxims (born 1613)
March 27 – William Maurice, Welsh antiquary (born c.1620)
June 18 – Samuel Butler, English satirical poet (born 1612)
July 3 – John Martyn, English publisher and bookseller
July 26 – John Wilmot, 2nd Earl of Rochester, English poet (born 1647)
November – Carr Scrope, English poet (born 1649)
December 4 – Thomas Bartholin, Danish scientist and theologian (born 1616)
unknown date – François de Grenaille, French dramatist and translator (born 1616)

References

 
Years of the 17th century in literature